The initials MDU may refer to:

 Mains distribution unit, electrical device
 Maharishi Dayanand University in Rohtak, Haryana, India
 Manchester Debating Union
 McGill Debating Union, a student-run debating society at McGill University.
 Medical Defence Union, medical defence organisation providing legal support should its members' clinical competence be questioned
 Methylene diurea, a chemical compound
 Military Democratic Union (Unión Militar Democrática), clandestine Spanish organisation of military officers in the late- and post-Franco era.
 MingDao University, a university in Changhua County, Taiwan
 MDU Resources (Montana-Dakota Utilities), American diversified energy company
 Multi-dwelling unit, classification of housing
 MDU, IATA airport code of Mendi Airport in Papua New Guinea
 MDU, Indian Railways station code of Madurai Junction railway station in Tamil Nadu, India